In Greek mythology, Karpos (Ancient Greek: Καρπός : Karpós; , literally "fruit"), was a youth renowned for his beauty.

Karpo, one of the Horae, is the feminine equivalent of Karpos; her dominion being the fruits of the earth.

Greek mythology 
The story, told in Nonnus's Dionysiaca, tells about the love of two youths, Karpos and Kalamos, son of Maiandros (god of the Maeander river). Karpos drowned in the Meander river while the two were competing in a swimming contest and in his grief, Kalamos allowed himself to also drown. He was then transformed into a water reed, whose rustling in the wind was interpreted as a sigh of lamentation, while Karpos was became 'the fruit of the earth'.

Etymology 
The word Karpos derives from the Proto-Indo-European language root *kerp-. Cognates can be found in many Indo-European languages including modern English in words such as "harvest" (via Germanic), "carpet", "excerpt" and "scarce" (via Latin).

References

External links 
 

Greek gods
Greek deities
Food gods
Food deities
Characters in Greek mythology
LGBT themes in Greek mythology
Fictional LGBT characters in literature
Metamorphoses into plants in Greek mythology